The Christian Workers Union of Sweden was a short-lived Christian anti-socialist labour organization in Sweden, founded in 1898. The organization sought to build a non-socialist alternative to the mainstream trade union movement. In 1899, the Malmö and Limhamn local branches joined a new Christian Workers Union of Sweden.

References

1898 establishments in Sweden
Trade unions in Sweden
Trade unions established in 1898
Trade unions disestablished in the 1890s